Sonrisa is a song by French singer Kendji Girac, it was released on July 4, 2016. The song peaked at number 25 in France and 42 in Belgium. The song had 40 million views.

Music video
"Sonrisa" was released on July 4, 2016, on YouTube, the song see white horses and black bulls and was filmed on a beach with Kendji Girac, as in February 2021, the song has received 40 million views.

Charts

References

2016 songs
2016 singles
Spanish songs
Kendji Girac songs